Mokerang is an Austronesian language spoken on Los Negros Island, immediately east of Manus Island in Manus Province, Papua New Guinea.

References

Manus languages
Languages of Manus Province